Noah Mintz (born September 1970) is a Canadian rock singer-songwriter, guitarist and mastering engineer. Mintz founded the band hHead with Brendan Canning in the 1990s. He released solo material under the name Noah's Arkweld following the breakup of hHead. Leslie Feist was the original bass player of Noah's Arkweld.

He works as a mastering engineer at the Toronto studio Lacquer Channel, where he has worked on albums by The Constantines, Sarah Harmer, Arkells, Broken Social Scene, Billy Talent, Death from Above 1979, Dual, The Marble Index, Danko Jones, Rheostatics, The Dears, Len, Hayden, This Rigid Empire, Uncle Seth and Stars.

Discography

hHead
 Fireman (1992)
 Jerk (1994)
 Ozzy (1996)

Noah's Arkweld
 Fun! (1997)
 Names for Shapes That Don't Exist (2009)

References

External links
 Noah Mintz bio at Lacquer Channel
 AllMusic entry for hHead

Canadian rock singers
Canadian male singers
Canadian rock guitarists
Canadian male guitarists
Canadian singer-songwriters
Canadian audio engineers
Living people
Musicians from Toronto
Canadian alternative rock musicians
Canadian male singer-songwriters
1969 births